Luis Éder Valencia Mosquera (born 4 April 1982), commonly known as Éder Valencia, is an Ecuadorian footballer who last played as a midfielder for Manta.

Personal life
He is the older brother of Ecuador national team player Antonio Valencia.

References

External links
  Profile at

1982 births
Living people
People from Nueva Loja
Association football midfielders
Ecuadorian footballers
Ecuador international footballers
C.D. El Nacional footballers
C.S.D. Macará footballers
C.D. Universidad Católica del Ecuador footballers
Deportivo Azogues footballers
C.D. Olmedo footballers
C.S.D. Independiente del Valle footballers
Manta F.C. footballers